ST Engineering Land Systems Ltd (STELS), doing business as ST Kinetics, is a strategic business area of ST Engineering and handles land systems and specialty vehicles.

In 2000, ST Engineering acquired the Chartered Industries of Singapore (CIS) through ST Automotive, a subsidiary of ST Engineering, and the new company was named ST Kinetics. Given the initial charter of CIS to support the local defence requirements, the main defence customer of ST Kinetics remains as the Singapore Armed Forces (SAF).

Besides manufacturing small arms and munitions, some of STELS' key military products include the SAR 21 assault rifle, the Bionix AFV, the Bronco All Terrain Tracked Carrier and the Terrex APC. These weapons and ammunition are often made to the United States or NATO specifications for export. The company holds a number of subsidiaries overseas, mainly in the United States, Canada and China.

Recent acquisitions between 2004 and 2009 have seen new construction equipment, specialised bodies and trailers for urban services being brought into ST Kinetics' stable of products, which was previously dominated by military weapons and platforms. Together with the other ST Engineering companies, STELS is part of the Singapore Defence Ecosystem of users, developers and producers in support of the Third Generation SAF.

History

1967–1986: Rapid growth and expansion
CIS was originally incorporated on 27 January 1967, when it started out by producing ordnance for the SAF. CIS' first product was the 5.56×45mm NATO round; other CIS products include the license-built Colt M16S1 (equivalent to the M16A1), and locally designed weapons such as the Ultimax 100 SAW, the SAR-80 and the SR-88 assault rifles. Several other companies were formed under CIS over the span of the next 2 decades, with the expansion of the defence business, such as Unicorn International (UI) in 1971, Ordnance & Development Engineering (ODE) in 1973, Singapore Test Services (STS) in 1980 and Chartered Chemicals (CCI) in 1982.

Shortly after the formation of CIS, the Defence Minister, Dr Goh Keng Swee, went on to set up several other government-linked defence industries to provide indigenous support for the SAF. One of them was Singapore Automotive Engineering (SAE). SAE was to support automotive-related services for the SAF, and its first immediate task was to service and maintain a fleet of V200 armored vehicles. By 1982, amidst a young, thriving Singapore economy and having built up its capability in automotive servicing and standards, SAE saw the potential in the commercial sector and decided to incorporate SAE Inspection Centre for vehicle inspection and servicing. The following year, Singapore Commuters, a taxi service, was formed.

1987–1996: Reformation
On 20 August 1991, SAE was publicly listed on the Singapore Stock Exchange. In the same year, SAE was renamed Singapore Technologies Automotive (ST Auto). STA Detroit Diesel-Allison was formed to take on the maintenance of the Detroit diesel engines and Allison transmission used in the Bionix as well as to distribute the Detroit Diesel parts in the Asian region.

Singapore Commuters was merged with Singapore Airport Services Ltd (SABS Taxi Ltd) and Singapore Bus Service Taxi Pte Ltd (SBS Taxi Pte Ltd) to form CitiCab in April 1995. By 1996, CIS through its various subsidiaries were producing various ordnance for the SAF and for export overseas. Chartered Ammunition Industries (CAI) was producing small, medium and large caliber ammunition, explosives, pyrotechnics and anti-tank weapons. ODE was producing medium to large caliber weapon systems (mortars, medium caliber cannons, FH88, FH2000). Chartered Firearms Industries (CFI) was producing infantry and crew-served weapons, including the SR88A assault rifle, Ultimax 100, 7.62 mm GPMG, the 40 mm grenade launchers, and the 40/50 Cupola Weapon system. Allied Ordnance of Singapore (AOS) was offering a range of advanced low-level air defence equipment, including the 40 mm L70 air defense gun system, and missile and Optronic fire control systems.

For the automotive business, ST Auto took on the AMX-13 Light Tank upgrading project, and refurbished the M113 APC, Commando V100 and V200 armored vehicles, LARC V amphibious. ST Auto also signed a contract with the SAF to overhaul, maintain and repair its military ground equipment. Singapore Test Services by then was offering specialized tests and inspection services to both military and civilian customers.

1997–present: Reinvention
In 1997, ST Auto, together with Singapore Technologies Aerospace Ltd (ST Aerospace), Singapore Technologies Electronics Ltd (ST Electronics), and Singapore Technologies Marine Ltd (ST Marine), were merged to form the present ST Engineering.

In October 1999, ST Engineering acquired CIS at S$78 M. ST Auto and CIS were merged in Feb 2000 to form ST Kinetics. The following year, ST Kinetics reorganised itself into 3 divisions, namely Automotive; Munitions and Weapons; and Services, Trading and Others. A series of flagship products were developed by the early 21st century, including the SAR21 assault rifle, the Primus 155mm self-propelled artillery gun, the Pegasus 155 mm lightweight howitzer, the Bronco All-Terrain Tracked Carrier and the Terrex 8×8 Armoured Personnel Carrier.

ST Kinetics went on to invest in several companies overseas to enhance its engineering capabilities. An example was the acquisition of Silvatech Industries Inc in July 2006, a Canadian company specialising in forestry equipment, and renaming it as Kinetics Drive Solutions (KDS) in August 2006 to focus on the Infinitely Variable Transmissions (IVT) that Silvatech had developed for its forestry equipment.

2003 was the year ST Kinetics decided to venture into the new commercial vehicles business to leverage on the engineering and fabrication capabilities it has acquired through the military vehicle projects. That year, ST Kinetics went into an equal-share joint venture with Beijing Heavy Duty Truck Plant (BHDTP) to form the Beijing Zhonghuan Kinetics Heavy Vehicles Co. Ltd (BZK).

In 2005, ST Kinetics acquired Specialized Vehicles Corporation in U.S. along with its Hackney and Kidron brands, 2 market leaders in the U.S. beverage truck bodies business. In the same year, ST Kinetics signed a 60–40 joint venture with Guiyang City Industrial Investment Holding Corporation (GIIHC) to form Guizhou Jonyang Kinetics Co., Ltd. (GJK) that manufactures excavators, and set up STAR Guangzhou and STAR Hangzhou.

In June 2006, ST Kinetics wholly acquired Leeboy through ST Engineering's U.S. subsidiary, VT Systems. Leeboy is a U.S. industry leader in commercial class asphalt pavers.

In 2012, ST Kinetics reorganised itself into 2 business groups. The Defence Business Group handles all military business and the Commercial Business Group manages the commercial businesses.

On 5 March 2012, ST Kinetics is one of 6 companies that were blacklisted by India's Ministry of Defence for 10 years. The company was issued a show cause notice before it was blacklisted. On 25 May 2012, ST Kinetics filed a writ petition in the High Court of Delhi against the Indian Ministry of Defence (MoD) and the Indian Ordnance Factory Board (OFB), challenging the debarment order.

In February 2013, ST Kinetics appointed Tata International as its distributor in Africa, thus expanding its distribution and customer support network for both its LeeBoy and TRXBUILD brands in 13 other countries. In the same year, ST Kinetics established 2 new overseas subsidiaries in Brazil and Myanmar. In July, the company acquired Technicae Projetos e Servicos Automotivos for BRL1.04 million. This acquisition will expand the company's reach into Brazil's growing defence business.

Established in November 2013, the wholly owned subsidiary, Kinetics Automotive & Specialty Equipment Co., Ltd (KASE) was set up in Yangon, Myanmar. This Myanmar subsidiary will serve as a platform to introduce and support ST Kinetics' automotive and specialty vehicles products and services in Myanmar's burgeoning economy, as part of its plan to grow its commercial business in the country.

Ordnance

M16S1 5.56 mm assault rifle
The M16S1 is the M16A1 rifle made under license by STELS. It was the standard issue weapon of the Singapore Armed Forces and being replaced by the newer SAR 21 in most branches. It is, however, the standard issue weapon in reserve forces.

Ultimax 100 5.56 mm section automatic weapon

The Ultimax 100 was designed by L. James Sullivan, who previously had redesigned Eugene Stoner's 7.62 mm AR10 assault rifle into a smaller 5.56 mm version, the M16. The Ultimax 100 was considered by experts as one of the most manageable light machine guns in the world. The Ultimax 100 makes use of Sullivan's patented counter recoil mechanism that makes the Ultimax 100 "not just a manageable full-automatic weapon, but a machine gun that can be aimed".

SAR 21 5.56mm assault rifle

In the mid 90s, the SAF decided to develop an indigenous rifle to replace the aging M16S1, most of which had been in service since the 70s. The other option was to procure new—and more expensive—weapons, with the chief contender being the M16A2. The Advanced Combat Rifle was conceived, and it eventually became the SAR 21. The SAR 21 is the first production assault rifle of its class to incorporate a built-in Laser Aiming Device (LAD) (powered by a single "AA" battery) as standard. The rifle incorporates various patented safety features, such as a Kevlar cheek plate and overpressure vent that protects the shooter in the unlikely event of a chamber explosion or catastrophic failure. It also has an integral 1.5× optical scope that is built into its carrying handle. The scope aids in target acquisition, particularly under low light conditions. The scope is factory-zeroed, and requires minimal further zeroing to suit different users. This minimizes non-training range time to zero the weapons and maximises live-firing training hours.

See also:
SAR-80 – 5.56 mm assault rifle
SR-88 – 5.56 mm assault rifle

BR18 (Formerly the Bullpup Multirole Combat Rifle)

Singapore Technologies Kinetics Ltd unveiled the Bullpup Multirole Combat Rifle (BMCR) during the Singapore Airshow 2014. Claimed to be the shortest bullpup rifle in the world with a 14.5-inch barrel, the BMCR provides ease and comfort for soldiers to manipulate in tight spaces. The BMCR is designed to fire NATO SS109 5.56mm ammunition and ST Kinetics' Extended Range 5.56mm ammunition, and come standard with MIL-STD-1913 Picatinny Rails at the three, six, nine and 12 o’clock positions. The rifle is fully ambidextrous and possesses flexibility for assault, marksman and suppressive roles.

The weapon was renamed as the BR18, is scheduled to be in production by 2018.

Conventional Multirole Combat Rifle (CMCR)

The 5.56mm Conventional Multirole Combat Rifle (CMCR) was released during the Singapore Airshow 2014. Equipped with a unique adjustable and foldable buttstock, the CMCR provides ease and comfort for soldiers to manipulate in tight spaces. The CMCR is designed to fire NATO SS109 5.56mm ammunition and ST Kinetics' Extended Range 5.56mm ammunition, and come standard with MIL-STD-1913 Picatinny Rails at the three, six, nine and 12 o’clock positions.

Compact Personal Weapon (CPW)

The CPW is a lightweight, multi-caliber Submachine Gun (SMG)/Personal Defence Weapon (PDW) for Close Quarters Combat (CQB/CQC) operations as well as engagements up to 150m.

The CPW is available in 9mm Parabellum (9×19mm NATO) caliber for now and "resembles an updated/modernized MP7A1". The main differences are the angled pistol grip of the CPW for enhanced ergonomics and natural aiming, and a transparent rear magazine so that the operator can see the rounds remaining. Other features include a skeletonised trigger, a full-length Mil-Std-1913 Picatinny top rail for mounting accessories such as optics and lasers, and a shorter bottom rail in front of the trigger guard for mounting a vertical foregrip.

The CPW weighs only 1.5 kg empty/dry (2 kg with a fully loaded 30-round 9 mm magazine) and uses a unique bolt lever cam recoil mitigation system to control recoil and muzzle rise to increase target hits. Full-auto cyclic rate of fire is a relatively high 900 to 1100 rpm.

40 mm weapon and munition systems

ST Kinetics is one of the few producers of both 40 mm munition and weapon systems. The range of 40 mm rounds include low velocity, high velocity, less-than-lethal, camera, self-destruct, airburst and enhanced blast insensitive explosive rounds. There are currently 3 weapon systems available, namely the 40 mm Grenade Launcher (40GL), the 40 mm Automatic Grenade Launcher (40AGL) and the 40 mm Lightweight Automatic Grenade Launcher (40LWAGL, a portable version that is half the weight of conventional AGLs). The 40AGL was made in 1990, followed by the 40LWAGL in 2001 (previously called the 40 mm Super Light Weight AGL). The 40AGL is mounted in combination with the 12.7-mm 50MG in the ST Kinetics' 40/50 cupola weapon system, installed on the M113 and Bionix. The 40AGL weighs 33 kg without mount or ammunition. The objective of ST Kinetics in designing the 40LWAGL was to keep the grenade launcher's weight to below 20 kg, or half the weight of conventional AGLs. Prototype weapons weighed around 14 kg and small quantities have been sold to a few countries, including Sweden, mostly for evaluation. St Kinetics is also collaborating with Australia's Metal Storm and Electro Optics System to develop a new high-speed and recoilless 40 mm grenade launcher called the Redback Lightweight. The company is reportedly the world's largest producer of the 40AGL, with more than 2,000 of the 40AGLs sold to the SAF and overseas customers. In 2008, the company entered into a teaming agreement with Electro-Optic Systems (EOS) and Metal Storm (MS) to develop a 3-shot under-barrel grenade launcher called the 3GL.  The 3GL is intended to replace the M203 under barrel grenade launcher for most military rifles including the M16, AK-47, SAR 21 and Steyr AUG.  It can also be detached to operate as a stand-alone weapon.

In September 2013, Thales and ST Kinetics agreed to develop, manufacture and market ST Kinetics' 40mm low-velocity air-bursting ammunition for the Australian and New Zealand markets. ST Kinetics also announced that the company secured a total of more than US$30 million worth of international orders from Canada and United States for its 40mm ammunition in October 2013.

50MG machine gun

The 50MG was developed in the 1980s by CIS to replace the   Browning M2HB machine guns used by the SAF. The CIS engineers learnt from the lesson of the unsuccessful American "Dover Devil GPHMG" programme, to create a modular weapon suited for modern tactical doctrines and production techniques. They succeeded and in 1988, CIS introduced the new machine gun and simply named it as the "CIS 50MG". The SAF used the 50MG in its infantry regiments and as a mounted weapon on armoured vehicles and naval craft. The STK 50MG is a gas-operated, air-cooled, belt-fed weapon. It has a quick-detachable barrel equipped with a carrying handle. The gun is operated using dual gas pistons, located in two gas tubes placed on either side of the barrel. The barrel is locked by means of a rotary bolt with multiple radial lugs that engages the barrel extension, eliminating the need for headspace adjustments. The STK 50MG utilizes the same "constant recoil" system used in the Ultimax 100. A unique feature of the 50MG is its dual belt-feed system that allows for fast and easy switching of ammunition from standard ball to armor-piercing Saboted Light Armor Penetrator (SLAP). Such systems are more commonly used in modern automatic cannons.

120 mm Super Rapid Advanced Mortar System (SRAMS)
The 120SRAMS is developed specifically for rapid and close range requirements of the battlefield. The semi-automatic Ammunition Transfer System and the patented Valve System in the breech mechanism provides an effective vent for the trapped air to let the bomb "free-fall" into the barrel. This reduces the projectile's in-bore travel and reportedly allows the 120SRAM to achieve the highest continuous firing rate of up to 18 rounds per minute—3 times faster than a conventional mortar system which can fire up to 6 rounds per minute. Recent product information has indicated the firing rate at a more modest 10 rounds per minute. The patented Cooling System is able to reduce the temperature that builds up in the barrel quickly to enable continuous firing without blockage. The patented Blast Diffuser reduces the blast overpressure by about 8 to 10 decibels. The 120SRAM is also currently the only system in the world with a recoil of less than 20 tonnes, which allows the 120SRAM to be mounted on board a 4×4 wheeled vehicle. The 120SRAM has a navigation and positioning system, power gun drives and integrated with an automatic fire control system, which require just a 3-person crew to operate the weapon.

FH-2000 field howitzer

The FH-2000 is a 155 mm 52-calibre towed howitzer gun and the "first 52 calibre field howitzer in service and in series production". Designed and built locally in Singapore by CIS, the FH-2000 deploys a crew of 8 and can use a low-powered self-propelled engine to travel at 10 km/h without towing. It fires projectiles to a maximum range of 42 km using special extended range ammunition that was field tested in New Zealand.

Pegasus 155mm lightweight howitzer

The Pegasus is the world's first heli-portable 155 mm 39 calibre self-propelled light howitzer, capable of offering aerial mobility for shoot and scoot. The Pegasus' automatic ammunition loading system, advanced sight, lightweight material and innovative recoil management make the Pegasus highly survivable, fast to deploy and easy to use.

Primus self-propelled artillery

The Singapore Self-Propelled Howitzer 1 (SSPH 1) Primus is a self-propelled artillery unit armed with a 155 mm howitzer jointly developed by the SAF, Defence Science and Technology Agency (DSTA) and ST Kinetics. Primus provides the range, firepower and accuracy of the artillery while keeping its weight below 30 tons and width below 3m. Other self-propelled guns such as the U.S. (M109 Paladin), Britain's (AS90 Braveheart), Japan's (Type 75) and Russia's (2S3M1) were either too heavy, at over 50 tons, or too wide, beyond 3m, for the tropical rainforest and swampy terrains. The chassis is based on the proven United Defense M109 155 mm self-propelled howitzer, with a new power pack similar to the one fitted on the Bionix infantry fighting vehicle (IFV). The power pack consists of a Detroit Diesel Corporation 6V 92TIA diesel engine developing 550 hp coupled to a General Dynamics Land Systems HMPT-500-3EC fully automatic transmission. The maximum road speed of the Primus is 50 km/h, with an operating range of 350 km, its combat weight is of 28.3 tons allows it to use the SAF 's current military bridging systems. The Primus could be deployed by the future Airbus A400M Transport aircraft.

Bionix armoured fighting vehicle

The Bionix was the first local armoured fighting vehicle, designed and developed by ST Kinetics. It is a medium-weight tracked vehicle, weighing between twenty-two to twenty-eight tonnes, to replace the aging M-113A2 armoured personnel carriers. The Bionix was commissioned by the SAF in September 1997 and operated under the 42nd Battalion of the Singapore Armoured Regiment (42 SAR). During the commissioning parade in July 1999, then Deputy Prime Minister and Minister for Defence, Dr Tony Tan, declared the Bionix IFV to be "a highly effective indigenous armoured vehicle". The Bionix was eventually succeeded by the Bionix II, which was jointly developed by the SAF, the Defence Science and Technology Agency (DSTA), and ST Kinetics.

Bronco all-terrain tracked carrier

The Bronco is manufactured by ST Kinetics for the Singaporean Army and in small amounts as an UOR for the British Army in Afghanistan. The company is also manufacturing the firefighter and other civilian variants of the ATTC under its U.S. subsidiary, Hackney where it is positioned as a disaster recovery vehicle with its ability to access uneven and soft terrains impassable to normal vehicles after earthquakes, floods or other major urban catastrophes. Another commercial variant, the All Terrain Tracked Emergency-Engineering Car 全地形履带式工程抢险, is also under development by its China subsidiary, GJK, in a bid to leverage on China's cost advantage. Competition would include the Russian Vityaz DT-(10/20/30)P models and BAe Hagglunds' BVS10.

Terrex AV81 8×8 AFV

The Terrex AV81 is an armoured fighting vehicle weighing between 25 and 30 tons an 8×8 wheeled chassis and modern armour. Multiple weapon platforms are supported, including both the remote and overhead weapons stations. The Terrex's modular design allows for different level of armour protection and weapon systems. It is designed to be air-portable by C-130s or equivalent cargo aircraft. The Terrex uses a patented independent double wishbone suspension, which greatly improves ground mobility and comfort during rides over rough terrains. The use of automatic traction control and the capacity for large footprint off-road tyres enables the Terrex to reach high speed on soft ground. The vehicle has a double hull with an external V-hull that improves mine blast survivability. Add-on armour provides further protection for troops. It is also capable of providing full chemical, biological and nuclear protection in extreme operational conditions. The baseline configuration is fully amphibious. Two water jets mounted on either side at the back of the hull propel the vehicle through water at 10 km/h. Initially developed for export sales from the number of emerging wheeled armoured vehicle requirements including U.S. Interim Brigade Combat Team (IBCT) concept, which calls for the need of wheeled armoured fighting vehicles (AFV) as opposed to tracked AFVs. In 2006, the SAF decided to purchase 135 units to replace their aging V-200 armoured vehicles. The Indonesian Army also indicated plans to purchase 420 units and to produce the Terrex under license locally.

Hunter armoured fighting vehicle

The Hunter was jointly developed with Defence Science and Technology Agency, and the Singapore Army. Intended to replace the Singapore Army's aging Ultra M113 armoured personnel carriers, it was commissioned in 2019. It is the Singapore Army's first fully digitalised platform and is designed to provide armoured forces with enhanced capabilities to operate more effectively and efficiently in various phases of military operations.

Other military and para-military products
Munitions
81 mm Mortar
120 mm Mortar
155 mm Large Calibre Munition
Hand grenades
Pyrotechnics

Small arms
7.62 mm General Purpose Machine Gun (GPMG)

Platform

Spider New Generation (New Gen) Light Strike Vehicle (LSV)
Light Armoured Multi-Role Vehicle (LAMV)
Mini All Terrain Vehicle (MATV)
Asset Maintenance
Contract Manufacturing

Homeland Security Solutions
Rapid Deployment Solution
Security Tamper Evident Bags (STEB)
Demul X Biological & Chemical Decontamination System (BCDS)
Integrated Mail Screening System (IMSS)
Demilitarisation services (Demil)
Analysis, Test and Evaluation (AT&E)
Advanced Logistics Proactive Solutions (ALPS)

Commercial equipment
ST Kinetics started on the commercial vehicle business in 2004 and has yet to establish a presence in the global marketplace even though its subsidiaries are well-established brands within their respective countries. In 2008, ST Kinetics began to market selected commercial vehicles and the hybrid drive solutions as ecological products.

Construction vehicles
ST Kinetics' BZK JV in China produces fixed and articulated off-road dumptrucks ranging from 20 to 52 ton. BZK also produces complementary products like cement carriers and mixers and terminal port tractors for container ports operation. Jonyang excavators has been in operation in China and surrounding regions over 30 years, and manufactured both wheeled and tracked hydraulic excavators. LeeBoy has been a leading producer of commercial asphalt pavers and motor-graders since 1964 in the U.S.

Distribution vehicles
Hackney and Kidron are aluminium and refrigerated truck bodies manufacturers respectively in the U.S. Hackney beverage trucks has been marketing its optimised compartmentalisation and light-weight aluminium bodies as means to lower lifecycle costs to the operators. Kidron has pioneered multi-temperature distribution with its Adjustable Compartmentalised Multi-temperature System (ACMT) of movable partitions. The ACMT allows configuration of loads requiring different temperature and compartment sizes.

Urban and emergency vehicles
Hackney Emergency also designs emergency vehicles for the U.S. markets such as firetrucks and HAZMAT vehicles.  ST Kinetics itself also produces a series of urban vehicles, such as ambulances, HAZMAT vehicles, fire engines, terminal prime movers for local use, mostly for local use by the Singapore Civil Defence Force and the Singapore Police Force.

In addition, ST Kinetics is the sole importer and distributor of MAN Truck & Bus vehicles within Singapore.

Automotive services
The automotive services have continued since the SAE days to become the Total Support & Services arm of the present day ST Kinetics. ST Kinetics continue to provide MRO services to military, commercial and general customers.

MRO services for military vehicles
As part of the integrated logistics support system for the major platforms, ST Kinetics has established the MRO services under its Kinetics Integrated Services (KIS) arm. KIS also provides maintenance of the existing SAF fleet of MAN trucks.

Component servicing
SDDA is both Detroit Diesel and Allison transmission's Asia distribution centre as well as a service hub for the overhaul of automotive engines, Allison transmissions and fuel injection pumps, and the servicing of electrical, electronic, hydraulic & mechanical components.

References
Notes

Bibliography

External links
ST Engineering Land Systems official website

Defence companies of Singapore
Engineering companies of Singapore
Military vehicle manufacturers